Peelton is a village 60 km north-west of East London and 16 km north-east of King William's Town. It was founded in 1848-49 as a station of the London Missionary Society. Named after Sir Robert Peel, former Prime Minister of Britain and First Lord of the Treasury in 1834; it takes its name from the Valley of Peel.

References

Populated places in Buffalo City Metropolitan Municipality